Hrana Vuković (1370 – 15 March 1435) was a Bosnian magnate who ruled the area between Neretva and Drina rivers in Bosnia with the title Grand Duke of Bosnia prior to 1380. He was the father of Sandalj Hranić and brother of Vlatko Vuković. After his death, he was succeeded by Vlatko Vuković as a head of Vuković-Kosača family, and Hrvoje Vukčić as a Grand Duke of Bosnia.

Sources

Further reading

Vuković noble family
Grand Dukes of Bosnia
1370 births
1435 deaths